The 1931–32 Illinois Fighting Illini men's basketball team represented the University of Illinois.

Regular season
The 1931-32 season was head coach Craig Ruby's 10th at the University of Illinois.  Ruby had 8 returning lettermen from a team that had finished in fourth place in the Big Ten the year before.  The team went through a nearly perfect non-conference season, losing only 1 game, however, the Fighting Illini showed no improvement in conference play by finishing with a record of 7 wins and 5 losses. The team finished the season with an overall record of 11 wins 6 losses.  The starting lineup included captain Elbert Kamp and Boyd Owen at guard, Robert Kamp and Robert Bartholomew as forwards and Caslon Bennett at center.

Roster

Source

Schedule

|-	
!colspan=12 style="background:#DF4E38; color:white;"| Non-Conference regular season
|- align="center" bgcolor=""

|-	
!colspan=9 style="background:#DF4E38; color:#FFFFFF;"|Big Ten regular season

Bold Italic connotes conference game
												
Source

Awards and honors

References

Illinois Fighting Illini
Illinois Fighting Illini men's basketball seasons
1931 in sports in Illinois
1932 in sports in Illinois